Rhine league may refer to:

League of the Rhine, a 17th century defensive union between German princes and France
Rhenish League of Cities, various alliances between German imperial cities in the 12th–15th centuries
Rheinischer Bund, or Rhine League, an organisation against robber barons

See also
Confederation of the Rhine, an 18th century alliance